The Arrondissement of Dendermonde is one of the six administrative arrondissements in the Province of East Flanders, Belgium. It is both an administrative and a judicial arrondissement. However, the Judicial Arrondissement of Dendermonde also comprises the municipalities of the Arrondissements of Aalst (except the municipalities of Geraardsbergen, Herzele, Sint-Lievens-Houtem and Zottegem) and Sint-Niklaas.

History
The Arrondissement of Dendermonde was created in 1800 as the third arrondissement in the Department of Escaut. It originally comprised the cantons of Aalst, Beveren, Dendermonde, Hamme, Lokeren, Sint-Gillis-Waas, Sint-Niklaas, Temse, Wetteren and Zele. In 1814, the municipality of De Klinge in the Arrondissement of Eeklo was added to the arrondissement.

In 1818, the arrondissements of Aalst and Sint-Niklaas were created. On this occasion, the canton of Aalst was ceded to the arrondissement with the same name and the cantons of Beveren, Sint-Gillis-Waas, Sint-Niklaas and Temse were ceded from the arrondissement in order to form the Arrondissement of Sint-Niklaas. Parts of Laarne and Kalken were ceded to the Arrondissement of Ghent in 1921 in order to form the new municipality of Beervelde.

Municipalities
The Administrative Arrondissement of Dendermonde consists of the following municipalities:
Berlare 
Buggenhout
Dendermonde
Hamme
Laarne
Lebbeke 
Waasmunster
Wetteren 
Wichelen 
Zele

References 

Dendermonde